Catherine Angela "Cat" Evans (born 27 December 1979) was the British Ambassador to Mali, also accredited to Niger from 2018 until 2020.

On 3 July 2018, at the HQ of the United Nations Multidimensional Integrated Stabilization Mission in Mali (MINUSMA) in Bamako, Evans signed a financial agreement committing some $2.3 million US dollars to a trust fund administered by MINUSMA in support of peace and security in Mali.

On 11 February 2019, Evans drew attention to her country's view that there was an alarming crisis in Mali and visited the leader of the Malian opposition Soumaila Cissé, seeking his point of view on the situation in the country and the level of political dialogue. 

She was replaced in March 2020 by Catherine Inglehearn. 

In 2020, Evans was appointed as Director of European Operations and African Outreach. 

In October 2022, she was appointed as a trustee of Transparency International, a global coalition against corruption.

References

Ambassadors of the United Kingdom to Mali
Ambassadors of the United Kingdom to Niger
1979 births
Living people
British women ambassadors
21st-century British diplomats